Nyman Brass is a 2006 album composed and produced by Michael Nyman and performed by Wingates Band.  It consists of suites from the films, The Ogre and The Libertine, and two additional shorter works: "In Re Don Giovanni", and "Chasing Sheep Is Best Left to Shepherds" from The Draughtsman's Contract, all arranged for brass.

2006 albums
Michael Nyman albums